Marco Audisio (born 29 July 1975) is an Italian rower. He competed in the men's lightweight double sculls event at the 1996 Summer Olympics.

References

External links
 

1975 births
Living people
Italian male rowers
Olympic rowers of Italy
Rowers at the 1996 Summer Olympics
Sportspeople from the Province of Varese
People from Cittiglio